Marian Florian Enache (born 5 August 1995) is a Romanian rower. He competed in the 2020 Summer Olympics.

References

1995 births
Living people
Sportspeople from Bucharest
Rowers at the 2020 Summer Olympics
Romanian male rowers
Olympic rowers of Romania